Edward Stevenson is a farmer from Northern Ireland. He is of British identity and Pro-Union. He has been Grand Master of the Orange Order since his election in January 2011.

Personal life
Stevenson is from Ardstraw, County Tyrone, Northern Ireland. He is married and has three children with his wife.

Orange Order
Stevenson joined the Orange Order in 1974. He rose to be County Grand Master of Tyrone and Deputy Grand Master of the Order. In January 2011, he was elected Grand Master of the Grand Orange Lodge of Ireland.

References

Living people
Farmers from Northern Ireland
People from County Tyrone
Grand Masters of the Orange Order
Year of birth missing (living people)